Zebra! Zebra! is the debut album from Vancouver dance-punk band Fake Shark - Real Zombie! released in Japan on April 25, 2007. Originally meant as an EP, they decided to add a few more songs to make it a full album. The album was released internationally on March 11, 2008.

Track listing
 "Wolf Is The New The" – 1:34
 "Panty Party Hand Cramp" – 2:27
 "Crystal Compass" – 3:51
 "Shame On You Scabs" – 1:59
 "Designer Drugs" – 2:33
 "Eenie Meanie" – 1:46
 "Shoreditch Vampire (Dialtone)" – 1:50
 "Dead Diy Die" – 1:10
 "WTF" – 2:04
 "Ferrits Beullers Day Off" – 2:23
 "Pair of Dice" – 1:38
 "Unusual Dorsal Features" – 7:25 (bonus track "These MC's")

Personnel
 Kevin "Kevvy Mental" Maher – vocals, synths, programming, bass guitar
 Louis Wu – guitar, vocals, bass guitar
 Malcolm Holt – drums
 Dan Hughes – bass guitar
 Parker Bossley – live bass

2007 debut albums
Fake Shark albums